The 2020 Vaahteraliiga season was the 41st season of the Vaahteraliiga, the highest level of American football in Finland. The regular season took place between July 30 and August 29, 2020. The Finnish Champion was determined in the playoffs, and at the championship game Vaahteramalja XLI the Kuopio Steelers defeated the Helsinki Wolverines. It was the Steelers' first championship title.

Standings

Playoffs

References

American football in Finland
Vaahteraliiga
Vaahteraliiga